Keith Konrad Slettedahl (born August 9, 1973) is an American musician.  He is the singer and songwriter for Los Angeles pop rock group The 88, known for the song "At Least It Was Here", the theme song for Community. In 2006, he appeared in the episode "Best Prom Ever" on the sitcom How I Met Your Mother.

References

1973 births
American rock musicians
Songwriters from California
Living people
People from Granada Hills, Los Angeles
The 88 members

External links